Smeaton railway station served the village of Smeaton, south of Musselburgh in East Lothian, Scotland, from 1872 to 1930 on the Macmerry Branch.

History 
The station was opened on 1 May 1872 by the North British Railway. At the north end was Smeaton Junction signal box, which opened before the station in 1867. This box was extended when the line to the north was doubled. The station closed on 22 September 1930.

References 

Disused railway stations in East Lothian
Former North British Railway stations
Railway stations in Great Britain opened in 1872
Railway stations in Great Britain closed in 1930
1872 establishments in Scotland
1930 disestablishments in Scotland